Giardini Ravino is an Italian botanical garden specialized in succulent plants and cacti, located on the island of Ischia, Campania, southern  Italy, in the Tyrrhenian Sea.

Giardini Ravino, along with the mature areas around Villa Ravino, is the result of 45 years of great passion and loving work of Signor Peppino, the villa's owner. Exotic trees include palms, olives, and lemon and orange trees. Grape vines and flowering climbers cascade over the walls, pergolas, and terraces.

See also 
official web page of this Garden on Ischia Island
 
 List of botanical gardens in Italy

Botanical gardens in Italy
Ischia
Gardens in Campania